Paradise Valley Unified School District #69 (PVSchools) is a school district serving northeast Phoenix, Arizona, and Scottsdale, Arizona. The district serves students in kindergarten through grade 12 with 30 elementary schools (free, full-day kindergarten through grade six), one K-8 school, seven middle schools (grades seven and eight), five high schools (grades nine through 12), two alternative schools and a K-12 online school, PVOnline. The district offers a variety of education choice programs, including K-12 International Baccalaureate, AVID, Core Knowledge, S.T.E.M. (science, technology, engineering and mathematics), CREST (Center for Research, Engineering, Science and Technology), Digital Learning Center, fine arts, The North Valley Arts Academies, career & technical education, Advanced Placement, before- after-school programs, sports and extracurricular activities for all ages. The district also provides gifted and special education programs.

The district is located in 98-square miles of northeast Phoenix and a portion of north Scottsdale. This area extends from 7th Avenue to Pima Road and is generally bordered on the south by Northern Avenue and the north by Jomax Road. With 32,000 students, it is the seventh-largest school district in Arizona.

History 
In 1913, local residents opened Sunnyside School on Cactus Road east of 32nd Street. The one-room schoolhouse, which served 21 girls and 13 boys its first year, was the predecessor to the Paradise Valley School District. In 1918, the school moved to a barn located at 32nd Street and Greenway. The building had a wood-burning stove and no indoor plumbing but had an outdoor facility. Due to failure to secure irrigation rights, many families left the area in the 1920s, resulting in no record of school from 1920 to 1923. In 1930, Edwin Nesbet donated land for a new campus for Sunnyside. Sunnyside continued to be the solo school for the district until the late 1940s, when electricity was made available in the area. Paradise Valley High School was constructed in 1957, which eliminated the need for 10th grade students to attend the Phoenix Union High School. That same year, Paradise Valley High School District was formed. To prepare for growth, the district constructed four new schools in the 1960s, thirteen in the 1970s, eleven in the 1980s, ten in the 1990s and nine more since 2000 as of 2020. In July 1976, the separate high school and elementary school districts combined to form the Paradise Valley Unified School District. In 1991, the 1930s Sunnyside campus, which had been expanded in the 1950s, was replaced with Greenway Middle School.

Elementary schools

 Boulder Creek  Est. 1996
 Cactus View  Est. 1992
 Campo Bello  Est. 1960 (reconstructed 2019)
 Copper Canyon  Est. 1993
 Desert Cove  Est. 1964 (reconstructed 2007)
 Desert Shadows  Est. 1972
 Desert Springs Preparatory  Est. 1980 (originally known as Acoma Elementary)
 Desert Trails  Est. 1996
 Eagle Ridge  Est. 1984
 Echo Mountain Primary (Pre-K-3)  Est. 1980 (originally Echo Mountain Elementary K-6) 
 Echo Mountain Intermediate (4-6)  Est. 2002 (constructed 1987 as expansion building for Echo Mountain Elementary)
 Fireside  Est. 2012
 Grayhawk  Est. 1998
 Hidden Hills  Est. 1988
 Indian Bend  Est. 1972

 Larkspur  Est. 1960s (reconstructed 2012)
 Liberty  Est. 1977 (reconstructed 2002-03)
 Mercury Mine  Est. 1976
 North Ranch  Est. 1987
 Palomino Primary (Pre-K-3)  Est. 1970s (reconstructed 1987)
 Palomino Intermediate (4-6)  Est. 2002
 Pinnacle Peak Preparatory (K-8)  Est. 2002
 Quail Run  Est. 1988
 Roadrunner  Est. 1991
 Sandpiper  Est. 1979
 Sky Crossing  Est. 2021
 Sonoran Sky  Est. 1994
 Sunset Canyon  Est. 1999
 Whispering Wind  Est. 1995
 Wildfire  Est. 2006

Middle schools

 Desert Shadows  Est. 1974
 Explorer   Est. 1997
 Greenway  Est. 1930 as Sunnyside School, current campus built in 1991
 Mountain Trail  Est. 2002

 Shea  Est. 1970 (reconstructed 1992)
 Sunrise  Est. 1981
 Vista Verde  Est. 1989

High schools

 Horizon High School   Est. 1980
 North Canyon High School   Est. 1991
 Paradise Valley High School   Est. 1957

 Pinnacle High School   Est. 2000
 Shadow Mountain High School  Est. 1974

Alternative schools

 Roadrunner  Est. 1960s as Roadrunner Elementary School
 Sweetwater Community School  Est. 1979 as Sweetwater Elementary School

K-12 Online school

 PVOnline

Former schools 

 Aire Libre Elementary  Est. 1979 (closed 2019)
 Arrowhead Elementary  Est. 1975 (closed 2019)
 Foothills Elementary Est. 1989 (closed 2014)
 Gold Dust Elementary (closed 2005) reopened as Cholla Complex
 Village Vista Elementary Est. 1980 (closed 2013)

District site
 Paradise Valley Unified School District

References

School districts in Phoenix, Arizona
School districts in Maricopa County, Arizona
1976 establishments in Arizona
School districts established in 1976